Guff may refer to:

Surname of various characters in the comic strip The Teenie Weenies
Nickname of a statue in Herald Square, New York City
Guff, Punjab, a place in Pakistan

See also
Guf